The Natara is a river in Sakha Republic (Yakutia), Russia. There are no settlements in its basin.

Course
The Natara is a right tributary of the Lena. Its source is located in the northern sector of the Verkhoyansk Range, on the western slope of the Dzhardzhan Range. It flows in a roughly westward direction. After leaving the mountains it descends into the Central Yakutian Lowland until it joins the right bank of the Lena  from its mouth.

See also
List of rivers of Russia

References

External links 
 Geography - Yakutia Organized

Rivers of the Sakha Republic
Central Yakutian Lowland